The people who currently identify themselves as  Basimba or BaShimba  for many and Musimba or MuShimba for singular are a Bantu speaking community  in Uganda. Before the 13th century they maintained a shared identity as Basimba, also defined in Swahili as "big lion," associated with either these people or the place which they came from.

The name Basimba or BaShimba (also known as the big Lion) was applied to the whole group by the early Ovambo people as a nickname for the leopard totem Clan people also known as bena Ngo in Zambia and in Uganda as abe Ngo.
 
The founder of Buganda, Kato Kintu in the 14th century was the first Kabaka of the Kingdom of Buganda the father of Chwa I of Buganda in his immigration to Buganda (by then known as Muwaawa), went with thirteen clans known as (Abalasangeye) under the Kintu dynasty, and among these thirteen Clans was the Basimba Leopard (Ngo) Clan. King Kateregga of Buganda, between 1674 and 1680 C. at the current Butambala District, persecuted the Leopard (Ngo) Clan people killing four hundred of its members and causing others to conceal their Cultural identity. Given the pre-eminent role of the Leopard (Ngo) Clan in the Cult of Kintu, these people expected that in the event they were discovered to be briefly related to the Leopard (Ngo) Clan would have far reaching consequences and the same happened during Kabaka Jjunju of Buganda.

Royal links
The Bashimba (Big Lion) of the Leopard totem Clan is a ruling Clan among the royal clans that moved from the Kingdom of Luba to the Luapula Valley in Northern Rhodesia.

The leopard (Ngo) totem clan is a kingship group among the Basimba (Big Lion) people which was persecuted so much in Buganda because of its royal links. Among the many Leopard Clan branches, one of it was eligible for the throne. Reigning kings of Buganda would always capture this group and execute most of its men to reduce the risk of being overthrown. Clans give a sense of shared identity and descent to members.

After the death of Kabaka Nakibinge of Buganda, his wife Nannono of the Leopard (Ngo) Clan between 1554 and 1556 AD, presided over as Kabaka for eighteen months and the name Nabulya which literally means ‘I ate it’ insinuating I once took royal power was introduced in the Leopard (Ngo) Clan to remind other Clans in Buganda that a woman from the Leopard totem Clan once had power in Buganda Kingdom.

Migration and settlement
Although little history has been known about the Basimba (Big Lion) people, more needs to be said because of their very close historical connection with the BaShimba who all belong to the Leopard (Ngo) Clan. Most Basimba people claim their origin lies in the Congo, among the Luba people of the Kingdom of Luba. Little is actually known about these immigrants, but traces of their history are found in the legend of the Tabwa ancestor.

Kyomba the ancestor of the Tabwa, a legendary man existed and lived on the Eastern shores of Lake Tanganyika. Faced with Hamitic pressures in the North and the people from the South to South, Kyomba and his companions crossed Lake Tanganyika by migrating to the Western shores of the Lake. Then Kyomba and his companions emigrated after the conspiracy mounted and hatched against him to the West and reached the shores of Lake Kivu. Then they crossed the Ruzizi and arrived Maniema and on the banks of river Lualaba to the second half of the 16th century. Fanger son of Kyomba and his companions continued their migration up the river while others went elsewhere. The name Tumanya means “those that have followed the route by water’’ and Bena Kilunga means “those who followed the path on land in their migration”. The Bena Kilunga group migrated to the eastern banks of the Lualaba River and Lukunga River, together with Buanza, Mumba and the Basimba people.
 
The Tumanya group migrated to Ankori or the Nkole people and eastwards following the Luvua (Lualaba) while their companions Lualaba River to back the lagoons in Upemba Depression. It was around the 17th century when the gradual arrival of people in the mountains from the plains of Lualaba Kamalondo and named these "Kundelungu" Mountains. Finally, Tanga and his father Kyomba further migrated across the Luapula at the current location of the position of Kasenga and settled in southern Tanganyika where they were joined by members of Zimba Clan, avoiding quarrels will Movwe who migrated to the Marungu highlands.

The Basimba or BaShimba immigrants seem to have come in ethnic groups under the leadership of Mambwe, Mauwe, Katunku, Ngulya, Mwati, Kaabya, Ntembe, Namuyonjo, Kabolesa, Kitembwa and Kooli among others. When these people reached Luapula Valley the current Luapula Province in Zambia, Mwanza Region, Northern Tanzania and at Butambala in Uganda, they decided to settle and the leader became the family or the Clan head. As the Basimba or BaShimba settlement grew the original leader, after several generations, became to his descendants as mythical.

Basimba or BaShimba people are recognized to be indigenous peoples, because they were the first comers among the immigrants in Zambia or Northern Rhodesia by then and in Tanzania, According to local tradition the original inhabitants were a Clan called the Basimba who lived in the area of Busere on Ukara Island, in the southeast corner of Lake Victoria, but it is not known what language they spoke and there are none of their descendants surviving. Tradition makes no mention of fighting between the Basimba immigrants and the people whom they found in Uhaya in Tanzania and at Butambala in Uganda. The Bashimba of the (Leopard clan) successfully resisted Nkuba in Northern Rhodesia (Zambia).

Original homeland
The original homeland of the Basimba or BaShimba people or their ancestry is shrouded in myths and legends. Whereas they seem to have lost contact with their original ancestors in Congo among the Luba people, leading to a cluster of Basimba (Big Lion) people migrate northwards from Mweru – Luapula to Mwanza Region eventually erecting Human settlement's among the Haya people in Tanzania, then at Butambala District in the central region of Uganda, Buddu in Masaka District, Ntakaiwolu in Busoga, Mpogo in Sironko District, Butaleja District and at Lupada, Naboa, Budaka District, among the Gwere people, in the eastern parts of Uganda. Other Bashimba people settled in Northern Rhodesia (Zambia)  which was part of Zimbabwe.

Culture
The Basimba practice the culture of performing rituals and ceremonies of the Chishimba spirit similar to the Loa or kongo loa culture practiced by the Basimba people of Haiti who were sold in slavery in Haiti from Congo.

The Basimba (Big Lion) people in Uganda maintain the Basimba Spiritual stone, this stone represents the Chishimba spirit and is related to the institution of kingship. Its absence constitutes the absence of political power. According to Traditional African religions, the Chishimba spirit is synonymous to kingship and similar to the Kintu cult practiced by the leopard (Ngo) Clan people in Buganda. The Chishimba is kept in a specially prepared basket called —the basket of the nation or land. It is wrapped with bark cloth and kept in a specifically prepared shrine ( or ) dedicated to the spirit.

Basimba people worked with Bunyoro-Kitara Kingdom's Priest in charge of the sacred pool of Muntebere. Each year the Bunyoro King sent a young slave-woman, two cows and a white sheep to the Priest. The slave-woman was given as a wife to one of the Abasimba Clan who was a servant of the Priest.

The abasimba dance

The abasimba dance of the Basimba people is a hunting dance performed by the Wajita or Jita people of Ukerewe Island.

The Basimba people Clan names of Uganda, Tanzania and Zambia are named after their lineal ancestors.

Beliefs
Nowadays, between 40% to 50% of the Basimba people are Christians and 50% are Muslim. Besides that, traditional beliefs are very widespread among them. The most important features are ancestor-worship (the term is called inappropriate by some authors) and totemism.

The Basimba of Kisangani who martyred Dr. Paul Carison of the Christ Church during the Congo Crisis  of 1964 to 1965 participated in the Simba Rebellion that was later defeated.

Ancestors
According to Basimba tradition, an afterlife does take place in another world, it is another form of existence in another world. The Basimba attitude towards dead ancestors is very similar to that towards living parents and grandparents. There is a famous ritual to contact the dead ancestors that is practiced by the Basimba people. It is similar to Haitian Vodou art related to Loa a Haitian vodou religion practiced by the Basimba people of Haiti, an island that was proclaimed by Napoleon as an independent republic in 1804 and often lasts all night.

Totems
Basimba totems (muziro) have been in use among the Basimba people since the initial development of their culture. Totems identify the different clans among the Basimba people that historically made up the dynasties of their ancient civilization. There are seven different totems that have been identified among the Basimba (Big Lion) people in Zimbabwe, Congo, Zambia and Uganda, such as the Basimba among the Haya Tribe in Tanzania.
People of the same Clan use a common set of totems usually animals or birds.

Examples of animal totems include Ngo/mbwili (Leopard), Leopard Cat, Genet Cat which in the Lega language is known as Musimba and also known as Kasimba in the Luganda language and known as Zimba in the Luba language and Nshimba in the Bemba language, Lion (Mpologoma), Mbwa (Dog), Kikere (Frog) and Nkoko (Rooster). People of the same totem are the descendants of one common ancestor (the founder of that totem) and thus are not allowed to marry or have an intimate relationship. The totems cross regional groupings and therefore provide a wall for development of ethnic group among the Basimba.

Basimba chiefs are required to be able to recite the history of their totem group right from the initial founder before they can be sworn in as chiefs.

Orphans
The totem system is a severe problem for many orphan, especially for Basimba or BaShimba women married to members of other clans. The Basimba people are afraid of being punished by ghosts, if they violate rules connected with the unknown totem of a foundling. Therefore, it is very difficult to find adoptive parents for such children. And if the foundlings have grown up, they have problems getting married and on their death they are not buried on the Basimba ancestral grounds.

Burials
The identification by totem has very important ramifications at traditional ceremonies such as the Basimba burial ceremony. A person with a different totem cannot initiate burial of the deceased. A person of the same totem, even when coming from a different tribe, can initiate burial of the deceased. For example, a Muganda of the Ngo (Leopard) totem can initiate burial of a Musimba of the Leopard totem and that is perfectly acceptable in Basimba tradition. But a Musimba of a different totem cannot perform the ritual functions required to initiate burial of the deceased.

If a person initiates the burial of a person of a different totem, he runs the risk of being asked to pay a fine to the family of the deceased. Such fines traditionally were paid with cattle or goats but nowadays substantial amounts of money can be asked for. If they bury their dead family members, they would come back at some point to cleanse the stone of the burial.

Basimba clan groups
The Basimba people consider themselves subjects of the Chishimba, the Basimba's single paramount Chief. These Basimba people lived in villages of 50 to 100 people and are now numbering to 100,000 in number by 2016. 
There are seven Basimba (Big Lion) people. Clan groups named after animals:
 The Leopard, (Ngo) Clan
 The Leopard Cat Clan
 The Genet Cat (Kasimba) Clan
 The Lion, (Mpologoma) Clan
 The Frog Clan
 The Dog Clan
 The Rooster Clan
Some of the Basimba people migrated northwards from Luapula valley after the disintegration of the Shila states and others remained in Northern Rhodesia currently known as BaShimba or abeena Ngo (Leopard) totem Clan. The BaShimba Leopard totem Clan is a ruling clan among the Lungu and Bemba.

Countries where Basimba people live
Basimba or BaShimba people exist in Zambia formerly known as Northern Rhodesia, Zimbabwe, Uganda, Haiti, DR Congo  and Tanzania. For example, the omugurusi of the Basimba clan is Mauwe who on the day of his birth a dog had puppies. This dog often washed Mauwe as a child by licking him. Mauwe later out of gratitude, ordered his descendants to consider the dog as their friend, the word "Basimba" or "BaShimba" actually has several meanings. It may designate people of Basimba people origin regardless of where they live e.g. whether they live in urban areas or in the original rural Basimba areas of Mpogo, Sironko, Lupada, Naboa in Budaka District or Butambala District, Mooni, Mbale District in Uganda, Luapula Valley in Zambia or Northern Rhodesia and  Kagera Region among the Haya tribe in Bugorora Ward or County of  Missenyi District in  Tanzania. The original language of the Basimba people is unknown.

The BaShimba people living in Zambia's Northern province, among the Lungu and Bemba tribes speak the language which is most closely related to the Bantu languages the Lungu and ChiBemba (in Zambia and the DRC), Haya (in Tanzania) and Luganda of the Baganda and Lugwere of the Gwere people (in Uganda). In Uganda, Luganda is mainly spoken in the central and eastern parts of Uganda, and has become the most widely spoken language in the Country, although not always as a first language.

Genealogy
The history or genealogy of the Basimba (Big Lion) people has given rise to numerous debates among historians to whether the Basimba people of the Leopard (Ngo)  Clan in Uganda come with Kabaka, Kato Kintu in the 14th century or migrated either direct from Congo or Luapula valley to Uganda.

Some historians, anthropologists, and sociologists including David William Cohen, Ian George Cunnison, Hans Cory, Mwelwa Chambika Musambachine, Gideon Were, Stephen Kyeyune, Tausir Niane, Mary Douglas, M. Hartnoll, Dr. Schinz and Fisher A. B among others have written books about Basimba people but have not stated the names of the Basimba ancestors who left the Luba people in Congo and migrated to places like Zambia, Zimbabwe, Tanzania and Uganda. Some historians who have written History of Africa books, use imprecise narrative documents to make estimates which must be treated with caution. Societies such as the Anthropological Society of London and Ethnological Society of London have also not yet published a full physical or cultural aspects of the Basimba people or due to the pronunciation of the name Basimba as Vazimba who migrated from East Africa and settled in Madagascar. The Vazimba are kinsmen of the Ba-Simba.

References

External links
List of the kings of Buganda
Ngo-Buganda Home Page
The Mpologoma (Lion) Clan - Buganda Home Page
› Africa › Zambia (Lusaka) › North-western.htm Bashimba Map, Weather and Photos - Zambia: stream - Lat:-11.9333 ...
Migration Bibliography: Democratic Republic of Congo (DRC ...
 Tabwa, Encyclopedia Britannica
 University of Iowa article

Bantu peoples
History of Africa